Giddi Eswari is an Indian politician and a member of the Andhra Pradesh Legislative Assembly from Paderu. Initially she was a teacher. She is the daughter of Appala Naidu, an ex - Member of Legislative Assembly.

Eswari was a member of the YSR Congress Party before joining Telugu Desam Party on 27 November 2017. She contested from Paderu constituency as MLA with TDP ticket in 2019 and lost in the election to Bhagyalakshmi Kothagulli over a margin of 50,000 votes.

References

External links 
 YSRCP demands resignation of Ministers
 Bakuri memorial pylon inaugurated in Agency
 Dispute that spilled out of Assembly
 Speculation rife on Giddi Eswari quitting YSRCP
 YSRCP MLA Giddi Eswari joins TDP

Andhra Pradesh MLAs 2014–2019
Telugu Desam Party politicians
Living people
Politicians from Visakhapatnam
Year of birth missing (living people)
YSR Congress Party politicians